Frédéric Fekkai (born 1958) is a French celebrity hairstylist and entrepreneur in the beauty industry.

Early life
Fekkai was born and raised in Aix-en-Provence, France. 
In 1979 at the age of 21, Fekkai moved to New York to start his career.

Career
After creating hairstyles for models on both catwalks and magazine covers, he opened two salons in New York City and Los Angeles and went on to launch his own line of hair care products. Fekkai has styled the hair of many prominent women, including Kim Basinger, Jessica Lange, Sigourney Weaver, Claudia Schiffer, Debra Messing, Renée Zellweger, and Hillary Clinton. He is often regarded as a celebrity hair stylist.

In 2015, Fekkai and his wife acquired Côté Bastide, a 25-year-old lifestyle brand from his hometown of Aix-en-Provence.  The couple relaunched the business as Bastide, a collection of natural beauty and luxury home products. The name is inspired by the couple's own bastide in Aix.

Personal life
Fekkai divides his time between New York City and Aix-en-Provence, France

References

External links
 
 

French hairdressers
French people of Algerian descent
French people of Vietnamese descent
1958 births
Living people
French businesspeople